Xanthodromia is a genus of flies in the family Empididae.

Species
X. tenuicaudata Saigusa, 1986

References

Empidoidea genera
Empididae